The Mexican Order of the Aztec Eagle forms part of the Mexican Honours System and is the highest Mexican order awarded to foreigners in the country.

History
It was created by decree on December 29, 1933 by President Abelardo L. Rodríguez as a reward to the services given to Mexico or humankind by foreigners. It corresponds to similar distinctions given to Mexican citizens such as the Condecoración Miguel Hidalgo or the Belisario Domínguez Medal of Honor. It is given by the office of the foreign minister on the instructions of a Council established for this purpose headed by the President. Its naming is partially taken from the Imperial Order of the Mexican Eagle, which was created by Maximilian I of Mexico on January 1, 1865.

Design
There is some design similarity of the order with the coat of arms of Mexico, particularly the golden eagle holding a rattlesnake, which is associated with the Aztec civilization.

Classes

Since 2011 
Since the reform of March 2011, the classes are :
 Collar ("Collar"), awarded to heads of state;
 Sash of Special Category ("Banda en Categoría Especial"), awarded to prime ministers and heads of government, hereditary princes(ses), consorts of heads of state, or to people whose category is tantamount to the previous;
 Sash ("Banda"), awarded to government ministers, secretaries, members of royal families, ambassadors, or individuals whose category is tantamount to the previous;
 Plaque ("Placa"), awarded to government undersecretaries, plenipotentiary ministers, consuls general, brigadier generals, rear admirals, as well to those whose category is tantamount to the previous;
 Venera (a type of insignia), awarded to ad hoc business representatives, colonels and lieutenant colonels, captains of a ship, equivalent servants of embassies in Mexico, as well to those whose category is tantamount to the previous;
 Insignia, awarded to ad interim business representatives and other members of diplomatic missions; captain, navy lieutenant, as well to those whose category is tantamount to the previous and to those cases the Council considers pertinent.

All grades except the collar may be awarded, under the Council's discretion, to distinguished foreigners.

Before 2011 
Prior to the 2011 reform, the classes were, in descending order:
 Collar ("Collar"), awarded to heads of state;
 Grand Cross ("Cruz"), awarded to prime ministers and heads of government
 Sash ("Banda"), awarded to government ministers, secretaries and ambassadors
 Medal ("Medalla"), awarded to government undersecretaries, plenipotentiary ministers, as well to those whose category is tantamount to the previous;
 Placard ("Placa"), awarded to ad hoc business representatives, colonels and lieutenant colonels, captains of a ship, equivalent servants of embassies in Mexico), as well to those whose category is tantamount to the previous;
 Venera (a type of insignia), awarded to ad interim business representatives and other members of diplomatic missions;
 Insignia proper, awarded under the Council's discretion; and
 Honorable Mention ("Mención Honorífica").

Notable recipients

Royalty

Presidents

 Edvard Beneš – Collar (1935)
 Dwight David Eisenhower – Collar (1945)
 Chiang Kai-shek – Collar (1945)
 Juscelino Kubitschek – Collar
 Rafael Trujillo – Collar
 Charles de Gaulle – Collar
 Josip Broz Tito – Collar (1963)
 Julius Nyerere – Collar (1975)
 Todor Zhivkov
 Lennart Meri – Collar (1995)
 Luiz Inácio Lula da Silva – Collar (2007)
 Michelle Bachelet – Collar (2007)
 Nelson Mandela – Sash (2010)
 Juan Manuel Santos – Collar (2011)
 José Mujica – Collar (2014)
 Dilma Rousseff – Collar (2015)
 Mauricio Macri – Collar (2016)
 Sergio Mattarella – Collar (2016)
 Marcelo Rebelo de Sousa – Collar (2017)
 Pratibha Patil – Sash (2018)
 Manuel Luis Quezon – Collar

Politicians

 Edmond Leburton
 Alexandra Kollontai – Sash (1944)
 Henry Harley Arnold – Collar (1945)
 Dr. Jože Brilej – Sash (1950s)
 Takeo Miki – Sash (1967)
 Mark Shurtleff,  Utah Attorney General – Plaque (placa) (2006)
 Lisa Shoman – Sash (2008)
 Ted Kennedy – Sash (2008)
 Yves Ducharme
 José Manuel García-Margallo (2015)
 Benoît Hamon
 David Dreier (2017)

Other

 Walt Disney (1943)
 Spencer Atkinson (1946)
 Nettie Lee Benson (1979)
 Nigel Davies (1980)
 Edward Hidalgo (1980)
 Diana Kennedy (1981)
 Gabriel García Márquez (1982)
 Claudio Arrau (1982)
 Plácido Domingo – (1985)
 W. Michael Mathes (1985)
 Dr. Donald Winkelmann (1994)
 Yuri Knorozov (1995)
 Hector P. Garcia (1998)
 Satish Gujral – Insignia proper
 Charles Butt – (2001)
 Melinda Gates – Insignia proper (2007)
 Anne d'Harnoncourt – Insignia proper (2007)
 Rigoberta Menchú – Insignia proper (2010)
 Mario Vargas Llosa (2011)
 Amartya Sen (2011)
 Bono – Insignia proper (2012)
 Takashi Yamanouchi (2013)
 Cesar Chavez
 Ralph Roeder
 Susan Hussey, Baroness Hussey of North Bradley (2015)
 Stuart Gulliver (2017)
 Roderic Ai Camp (2017)
 Rick Bayless (2017)
 Jared Kushner – Sash (2018)

Collars
 Akihito
 Bhumibol Adulyadej
 Michelle Bachelet
 Beatrix of the Netherlands
 Josip Broz Tito
 Carl XVI Gustaf
 Fidel Castro
 Edvard Beneš
 Dwight D. Eisenhower
 Elizabeth II
 Cristina Fernández de Kirchner
 Mauricio Funes
 Prince Richard, Duke of Gloucester
 Haile Selassie
 Henryk Jabłoński
 Juan Carlos I of Spain
 Juscelino Kubitschek
 Luiz Inácio Lula da Silva
 Mauricio Macri
 Margrethe II of Denmark
 Mohammed VI of Morocco
 Mohammad Reza Pahlavi
 Salman of Saudi Arabia
Grand Crosses
 Henry H. Arnold
 Princess Benedikte of Denmark
 Jože Brilej
 Maria Cavaco Silva
 Armand De Decker
 Guillermo Fernández de Soto
 Jean Gol
 Peter Hope (diplomat)
 Thanat Khoman
 Princess Lalla Hasna of Morocco
 Edmond Leburton
 Mahathir Mohamad
 Princess Margriet of the Netherlands
 Princess Marina of Greece and Denmark
 Prince Moulay Rachid of Morocco
 Charles-Ferdinand Nothomb
 Olav V of Norway
 Jacques van Ypersele de Strihou
 Ra'ad bin Zeid
 Suharto
Bands
 Infante Carlos, Duke of Calabria
 Charles, Prince of Wales
 Infanta Cristina of Spain
 Carlos Echeverri Cortés
 Felipe VI of Spain
 Henrik, Prince Consort of Denmark
 Princess Irene of the Netherlands
 Ted Kennedy
 Alexandra Kollontai
 Queen Letizia of Spain
 Nelson Mandela
 Queen Máxima of the Netherlands
 Takeo Miki
 Hirofumi Nakasone
 Sadako Ogata
 Pietro Parolin
 Prince Sahle Selassie
 Lisa Shoman
 Queen Sofía of Spain
Placards
 Bill Gates
 Charles E. Wilhelm
 Alan Yarrow
Insignia
 David Brading
 Melinda Gates
 Satish Gujral
 Anne d'Harnoncourt
 Alan Knight (historian)
Other or Unknown Classes
 Claudio Arrau
 Jack Austin (politician)
 Rick Bayless
 Nettie Lee Benson
 Elizabeth Hill Boone
 David Brading
 Jože Brilej
 Charles Butt
 David Carrasco
 Maria Cavaco Silva
 Alfredo Chiaradía
 Francesco Cossiga
 Nigel Davies (historian)
 Michel Descombey
 Plácido Domingo
 Yves Ducharme
 Elżbieta Dzikowska
 Luis Echeverría
 Trevor Eyton
 Jean-Louis Georgelin
 Nadine Gordimer
 John Greenslade
 António Guterres
 Jan Hendrix
 Edward Hidalgo
 Carla Anderson Hills
 Alfred Wilkinson Johnson
 Michael Kaiser
 Friedrich Katz
 Diana Kennedy
 Jean-Pierre Kingsley
 Nobusuke Kishi
 Yuri Knorozov
 Thomas Krens
 Ernest Krogh-Hansen
 George Kubler
 Jared Kushner
 Luis Leal (writer)
 Fred Martinez
 W. Michael Mathes
 Helmut Maucher
 José Carlos Millás
 Million Dollar Theater
 Paula Marcela Moreno Zapata
 Julius Nyerere
 Óscar Osorio
 Benoît Puga
 Mariano Rajoy
 Ann Richards
 Nelson Rockefeller
 Rodman Rockefeller
 Albert Sabin
 Eisaku Satō
 Walter Schwimmer
 Edward Seaga
 David Shaltiel
 Lemuel C. Shepherd Jr.
 Innis P. Swift
 Hugh Thomas, Baron Thomas of Swynnerton
 J. Eric S. Thompson
 Mario Vargas Llosa
 Baldemar Velasquez
 William Wasson
 David J. Weber
 Eliot Weinberger
 Raul Yzaguirre

Gallery

Additional sources
Mexican Chamber of Deputies
Olvera Ayes, David A. "La Orden Mexicana del Aguila Azteca - Apuntes para su Historia". Cuadernos del Cronista. México, 2011

References

External links
Medals.org.uk
Blasoneshispanos.com

Aztec Eagle
Aztec Eagle, Order of the
1933 establishments in Mexico
Awards established in 1933